Rudolf Paul Joachim Kochendörffer (21 November 1911 in Pankow – 23 August 1980 in Dortmund) was a German mathematician who was a Professor of mathematics in the University of Rostock specialising in algebra, Group theory and theory of finite groups and their representation. During World War II, Kochendörffer worked as a  mathematical cryptanalyst in the mathematical referat of Inspectorate 7/IV, that would later become part of Referat I of Group IV of the General der Nachrichtenaufklärung (abbr. GDNA), the signals intelligence agency of the Wehrmacht and was known as a cryptographic tester of the Enigma cipher machine. Kochendörffer was a Member of the Scientific Advisory Council for Mathematics at the State Secretariat for the Higher and Specialist Schools of the GDR, a staff member of Mathematical Reviews and collaborated with the Zentralblatt MATH

Personal life
Rudolf Kochendörffers father, Albert Kochendörffer(1877-1958) was a lending bookseller. His mother was Bertha Kochendörffer. In 1930, Kochendörffer completed his Abitur. Kochendörffer subsequently studied at the Technical University of Berlin from 1930 to 1936 on the study of mathematics, physics and philosophy.

In 1936, he was promoted to Dr Phil, with a doctoral thesis titled: Investigations on a presumption of W. Burnside (German:Untersuchungen über eine Vermutung von W. Burnside) (Burnside's theorem), whose doctorals advisors where among others, Ludwig Bieberbach, Issai Schur and Erhard Schmidt, but was forced to resign as a Jew in 1935. During 1938/9 he was an assistant at the University of Göttingen. From 1939 to 1942 he was an assistant to the cryptanalysis department of the German Foreign Office and from 1942-1945 he was employed as a mathematical cryptanalysis in the OKW/Chi and the GDNA. from 1946 to 1948 he worked as a Senior assistant at the Mathematical Institute of the Humboldt University of Berlin. In 1948, Kochendörffer  habilitated in the subjects of mathematics in Berlin, and was promoted to full professor, therein working as a lecturer. He then found position for a year as Professor with full lecturing for mathematics at the  University of Greifswald. At the start of the new decade in 1950, Kochendörffer became a Professor of Mathematics at the University of Rostock, a position he held until 1966.

Kochendörffer specialized in group theory. He was also known for writing various algebra textbooks. Between 1967-1970 Rudolf Kochendörffer was Visiting Professor of Mathematics, Faculty of Natural Sciences at the Johannes Gutenberg University of Mainz, and at the University of Tasmania. Between 1970-1977, Kochendörffer finished his career as Professor of Mathematics at the Technical University of Dortmund.

Honours
In 1960, he was awarded the Patriotic Order of Merit in Bronze, which was recognized in 1967. In 1963 he received the National Prize of the German Democratic Republic, National Prize III. for science and technology.

Publications
 Einführung in die Algebra. Berlin 1955, 4. Aufl. 1974. (English Edition: Introduction to algebra. Groningen 1972).
 Determinants and matrices (German:Determinanten und Matrizen). Leipzig 1957, 5. Aufl. 1967. (License Issue Stuttgart 1970).
 Lehrbuch der Gruppentheorie. Unter besonderer Berücksichtigung der endlichen Gruppen. Leipzig 1966. (English Edition: Textbook of the group theory with special consideration of the finite groups. Leipzig 1966, English Group Theory, McGraw Hill 1970).
 On supplements of finite groups. Groningen 1963.

References

1911 births
1980 deaths
German cryptographers
20th-century German mathematicians